Richard Henry Cummings (August 20, 1858 – December 25, 1938) was an American film actor of the silent era. Cummings performed in vaudeville and on stage before he began working in films. He appeared in more than 80 films between 1913 and 1930. He was born in New Haven, Connecticut, and died in Los Angeles, California.

Partial filmography

 Fate's Decree (1914)
 Double Trouble (1915)
 Daphne and the Pirate (1916)
 The Bad Boy (1917)
 Her Official Fathers (1917)
 A Mormon Maid (1917)
 Reaching for the Moon (1917)
 A Petticoat Pilot (1918)
 Danger, Go Slow (1918)
 Little Comrade (1919)
 The Last Outlaw (1919)
 Blind Husbands (1919)
 Common Property (1919)
 The Valley of the Giants (1919)
 The Delicious Little Devil (1919)
 The Adorable Savage (1920)
 The Prince of Avenue A (1920)
 Pinto (1920)
 The City of Masks (1920)
 What Happened to Jones (1920)
 Red Courage (1921)
 No Woman Knows (1921)
 Bride's Play (1922)
 The Great Alone (1922)
 Wolf Law (1922)
 Top o' the Morning (1922)
 Thundergate (1923)
 Itching Palms (1923)
 Thank You (1925)
 The Galloping Cowboy (1926)
 Old Gray Hoss (1928)
 The Social Lion (1930)

References

External links

1858 births
1938 deaths
American male film actors
American male silent film actors
Male actors from Connecticut
20th-century American male actors